Anne Amie is an Indian playback singer and voice artist. She marked her debut in playback singing with the solo 'Ethu Meghamaari - Reprise' for the film Kochavva Paulo Ayyappa Coelho. She received her first Filmfare Award in 2019 for the song 'Aararo' from the movie Koode. 

She debuted as a voice artist in malayalam cinema in 2020, dubbing for Kalyani Priyadarshan in Varane Avashyamund.

Early Life 
Anne Amie started singing at the age of 7. She was awarded first prize in Kerala State CBSE Youth Festival's Light Music competition in the Sub-Junior Category in the year 2000, while she was studying at 'Bharatiya Vidya Bhavan, Thrissur'.  

She did most of her schooling in Dubai, her alma mater being 'Our Own English High School, Dubai'. During this time, she was a regular at youth festivals and was awarded 'Kalathilakam' four times. She used to take part in multiple categories such as Light Music Malayalam and Hindi, Carnatic Music, Malayalam Poetry Recitation, Mappilapattu etc.  

She did her BBA from Christ University, Bangalore. She was part of the University's cultural team and in her final academic year, she was the University's Cultural Secretary, leading a cultural team of over 100 students. 

She did her Master's in International Business from University of Wollongong in Dubai and graduated as 'Top Graduate' of her batch. She was also a recipient of the "Dubai Academic Excellence Award", given that she had scored the highest aggregate across all the Master's Degree courses at the University.

Career 
She was one of the 42 finalists in the music reality show, 'Idea Star Singer - Season 2' on Asianet. She was also one of the 7 finalists from Dubai in the music reality show, 'Indian Idol - Season 3'.

Prior to entering the film industry, she was working at the American multinational investment banking firm, Goldman Sachs, in their human capital management division. Post her post graduation, she was working at the American web services provider, Yahoo!, as a creative analyst, which is when she debuted in the playback singing field. She was juggling between both professions for almost a year until she decided to call it quits and focus on just one, i.e. her music and cinema  journey.

She has worked with known music directors such as M. Jayachandran, Deepak Dev, Bijibal, Raghu Dixit, Shaan Rahman, Justin Prabhakaran, Gopi Sunder, Alphons Joseph, Ratheesh Vega, Jassie Gift, Shahabaz Aman, Afzal Yusuf, Mejo Joseph, Sushin Shyam, Hesham Abdul Wahab, Ifthi, Govind Vasantha, Vishal Chandrasekhar, Mujeeb Majeed, Neha Nair & Yakzan Gary Pereira, Arun Muraleedharan, William Francis, PS Jayhari, Mathews Pulickan, Varkey, Varun Sunil, Varun Krrishna, Rhithwik S. Chand, Ranjith Meleppat, A. R. Rakesh.

Discography

2015

2016

2017

2018

2019

2020

2021

2022

2023

Filmography

As Voice Artist

Awards

References

External links 
List of Malayalam songs by Anne Amie at MalayalaSangeetham
Anne Amie wins Best Singer Award at Filmfare South at TOI
Singer Anne Amie talks about new songs and dubbing career at ManoramaOnline
Shaan Rahman's mentoring gave me confidence to be a playback singer at TOI
New singer in the spotlight at Deccan Chronicle
Singer Anne Amie is on a roll at Hindu
Singer Anne Amie on dubbing for Kalyani Priyadarshan in Varane Avashyamund at Hindu
Singer Anne Amie - I was offered the opportunity to dub for Kalyani in Varane Avashyamund while I was in Chennai for Filmfare Awards at TOI 
Interview with singer Anne Amie on SitaRamam movie dubbing experience at ManoramaOnline
Interview with singer Anne Amie on dubbing in Varane Avashyamund at ManoramaOnline
Until Next Time with Hrushee | Anne Amie - Concept Interview
Exclusive Interview with Anne Amie | Part 1/2 | Tharapakittu | Kaumudy TV
Exclusive Interview with Anne Amie | Part 2/2 | Tharapakittu | Kaumudy TV
Anne Amie on Super Women | Women's Era | ChannelD
Chat with singer Anne Amie | Manorama News
Anne Amie | Sunday Funday | Amrita TV
Anne Amie | Joseph Annamkutty Jose | Mirchi Malayalam 

Living people
Indian women playback singers
21st-century Indian women singers
21st-century Indian singers
Filmfare Awards winners
Singers from Kerala
1991 births